Fort Lennox is a  National Historic Sites of Canada occupying   most of Île aux Noix, an island in the middle of the Richelieu River in the parish of Saint-Paul-de-l'Île-aux-Noix, Quebec, near the Canada-U.S. border. The fort features restored defence works and stonework buildings, and is surrounded by a star-shaped moat. It is owned by the Government of Canada and  managed by  Parks Canada

The site of Fort Lennox was a strategic location in defending Canada against invasion from the south during colonial times. It was first fortified by the French in 1759 to defend against British invasion during the French and Indian War and the current buildings were built by the British  between 1819 and 1829 to deter a U.S. invasion after the War of 1812. In 1920, it was designated a National Historic Site of Canada.    and is administered by Parks Canada.

As of December 2022, the Fort was undergoing renovation work and closed to the public and slated to be reopened to the public in spring 2023.

History

Built by the British between 1819 and 1829, the fort was designed to protect the colony from possible American invasion.  The fort was named after Charles Lennox, 4th Duke of Richmond, who died in 1819 and was Governor General of British North America. An earlier 1760s fort on the same site was originally built by the French during the Seven Years' War.

On 28 June 1985 Canada Post issued 'Fort Lennox, Que.' one of the 20 stamps in the "Forts Across Canada Series" (1983 & 1985). The stamps are perforated  x 13 mm and were printed by Ashton-Potter Limited based on the designs by Rolf P. Harder.

Museum
Visitors can tour the 1820s period officers' quarters. The north magazine features an exhibit about military engineering and restoration work carried out at the fort.

Guided tours are given of the grounds and buildings, which include an ordnance magazine and artillery magazine, a guardhouse, officers' quarters, barracks and casemates. During summer weekends, living history demonstrations focus on fort life in the mid 19th century.

Entry
Admission to the site includes the ferry ride to the island.  The parking lot and visitor reception area are located on the west shore of the river.  Boaters can visit the island directly and pay a separate fee to enter the fort.

References

 Parks Canada, Fort Lennox National Historic Site brochure, 2005.

External links

 Fort Lennox National Historic Site

National Historic Sites in Quebec
Museums in Montérégie
Military and war museums in Canada
Military forts in Quebec
Buildings and structures in Montérégie
History of Montérégie
History museums in Quebec
Le Haut-Richelieu Regional County Municipality